Buddhist Sin Tak College is a secondary school in Kwai Chung, New Territories, Hong Kong. It uses the English and Chinese languages as the media of instruction.

History
The school was established by the Hong Kong Buddhist Association (HKBA), which applied to the Hong Kong government in June 1969 for a piece of land in Tsuen Wan upon which to build a school. The proposal was accepted in July 1969 by the former Education Department. Chairman of the Hang Seng Bank, Ho Sin Hang, and his wife Madam Ho provided a donation toward the construction of the school. The school's name therefore incorporates characters from the Chinese names of the two donors ("sin", meaning kindness, and "tak", meaning virtue).

A foundation stone for the new school was laid in February 1973 by HKBA president Kok Kwong, Ho Sin Hang, Madam Ho, and New Territories district commissioner Denis Bray.

Classes began in September 1973.

School building
The six-storey school building has 39 teaching rooms. It is located opposite Kwai Hing Station of the Mass Transit Railway (MTR) system.

Faculty
As of 2021, the school employed 54 teachers. The principal is Ms. Chan Sai Wing.

References

External links

 

1973 establishments in Hong Kong
Buddhist schools in Hong Kong
Educational institutions established in 1973
Hong Kong Buddhist Association schools
Kwai Chung